Jabłonowo-Zamek  is a village in the administrative district of Gmina Jabłonowo Pomorskie, within Brodnica County, Kuyavian-Pomeranian Voivodeship, in north-central Poland. It is located in the Chełmno Land in the historic region of Pomerania.

The historic landmarks of the village are the Narzymski Palace and the Saint Adalbert church.

History

The oldest known mention of Jabłonowo comes from a document issued by Duke Konrad I of Masovia of the Polish Piast dynasty in 1222.

Following the joint German-Soviet invasion of Poland, which started World War II in September 1939, it was invaded and then occupied by Germany until 1945. From 1941 to 1943, Germany operated a Germinisation camp for Poles expelled from various places in Kuyavia and Pomerania, who were classified racially valuable by the occupiers.

References

Villages in Brodnica County